Miles Crowley (February 22, 1859 – September 22, 1921) was a U.S. Representative from Texas.

Born in Boston, Massachusetts, Crowley attended the common schools. He was employed as a longshoreman, moving to Galveston, Texas, in the 1870s. He served as assistant chief of the Galveston Fire Department, and studied law to gain admission to the bar in 1892, thereafter commencing practice. He served as member of the Texas House of Representatives in 1892, and in the Texas Senate in 1893 and 1894.

Crowley was elected as a Democrat to the Fifty-fourth Congress (March 4, 1895 – March 3, 1897). He was not a candidate for reelection in 1896, instead resuming the practice of law in Galveston. He served as prosecuting attorney of Galveston County from 1904 to 1912. In 1920, Crowley was elected judge of Galveston County Court, in which capacity he was serving at the time of his death there the following year. He was interred in Calvary Cemetery.

Sources

1859 births
1921 deaths
Politicians from Boston
People from Galveston, Texas
Democratic Party members of the Texas House of Representatives
Democratic Party Texas state senators
Democratic Party members of the United States House of Representatives from Texas
Texas state court judges